Firre (functional intergenic repeating RNA element) is a long non-coding RNA located on chromosome X. It is retained in the nucleus via interaction with the nuclear matrix factor hnRNPU. It mediates trans-chromosomal interactions and anchors the inactive X chromosome to the nucleolus. It plays a role in pluripotency and adipogenesis.

See also 
 Long non-coding RNA

References

Further reading 

 

Non-coding RNA